Kristian Wåhlin (born 4 December 1971) is a Swedish musician, singer, graphic designer and album cover artist for many bands in the  extreme metal scene worldwide. He is often credited under his pseudonym Necrolord.

Biography
Wåhlin's interest in art began while attending Schillerska Grammar School, a secondary educational institution in central Gothenburg. He has referenced Romantic and Renaissance painters like Caspar David Friedrich, Albrecht Dürer and Hieronymus Bosch as early influences. This interest also coincided with the time in which he studied music.

At the age of 17, Wåhlin formed Grotesque (as guitarist) with school friend Tomas Lindberg on vocals, Alf Svensson on guitar, and Tomas Eriksson on drums. The 1990 break-up of Grotesque would lead to the formation of At the Gates, who would be credited as instigators of the "Gothenburg Melodic death metal sound". Wåhlin would collaborate with Lindberg and other At the Gates members a short time additionally in the death metal band Liers in Wait, and would go on to design the "Russian icon" cover-art of At the Gates' cornerstone release, Slaughter of the Soul.

Dissection, who shared practice quarters with At the Gates, would display  illustrations by Wåhlin on the cover of The Somberlain and also Storm of the Light's Bane; the latter featuring the infamous scene of the "grim reaper horseman" in the middle of a snow-covered forest tundra. In the Nightside Eclipse, the debut of seminal Norwegian black metal band Emperor, would also be graced with his work on the cover. Wåhlin would continue as an album artist for several other bands in the European death, black, doom, power and gothic metal collective throughout the 2000s.

Liers in Wait and Decollation would feature musical contribution by Wåhlin before both groups folded in the mid-1990s. In 1995 he started gothic metal band Diabolique, where he was joined by some musicians from bands in which he had previously participated. Diabolique's latest release was The Green Goddess in 2001. They are currently writing material for an upcoming 2010 album. Wåhlin also collaborated with longtime friend Lindberg in the hardcore band The Great Deceiver.

His art studio is located in Höganäs municipality, Sweden.

Discography

Album covers

References

External links
Official website: Kristian Wåhlin

1971 births
Living people
Swedish heavy metal guitarists
Swedish heavy metal singers
Swedish heavy metal drummers
 
Swedish graphic designers
20th-century Swedish painters
Swedish male painters
21st-century Swedish painters
Album-cover and concert-poster artists
21st-century Swedish singers
21st-century guitarists
21st-century drummers
21st-century Swedish male singers
Liers in Wait members
Diabolique (band) members
20th-century Swedish male artists
21st-century Swedish male artists